The peerage is the collective term for all those holding titles of nobility of all degrees. The term superseded the term baronage used of the feudal era. 
A Barony is a rank or dignity of a man or a woman who is a participant of a small rank of a British nobility.

British Isles

Hereditary baronies
The hereditary baronies fall into five classes:
List of baronies in the peerage of England
List of lordships of Parliament (in the peerage of Scotland)
List of baronies in the peerage of Great Britain
List of baronies in the peerage of Ireland
List of hereditary baronies in the peerage of the United Kingdom

These have precedence in the order named, except that baronies of Ireland created after 1 January 1801 (the date of the Union between Great Britain and Ireland) yield to earlier-created baronies of the United Kingdom.

Life baronies
The life baronies fall into two classes:
List of life peerages (created under the Life Peerages Act 1958):
List of life peerages (1958–1979)
List of life peerages (1979–1997)
List of life peerages (1997–2010)
List of life peerages (2010–present)
List of law life peerages (created under the Appellate Jurisdiction Act 1876)

All life baronies are in the peerage of the United Kingdom, and rank amongst hereditary baronies in that peerage (and each other) by date of creation.

Hereditary feudal baronies
These are distinct from the  titles above,  created by writ or patent, and were constituents of the now defunct feudal baronage and are not therefore constituents of the modern, post-feudal peerage:

List of English feudal baronies
List of Scottish feudal baronies
List of Marcher lordships

See also
Baron
British nobility
Feudal baron
List of barons in the peerages of Britain and Ireland

References 

 
Baronies
Baronies